The 1971 Newfoundland general election was held on 28 October 1971 to elect members of the 35th General Assembly of Newfoundland. It resulted in a hung parliament as, with the support of the Labrador Party's lone MHA, the Smallwood government had the support of 21 MHAs compared to 21 for the Progressive Conservative party. Smallwood ultimately resigned in January 1972 allowing Moores' Tories to form a government but the instability in the House led to the March 24, 1972 provincial election.

Results

|- style="background:#ccc;"
! rowspan="2" colspan="2" style="text-align:center;"|Political party
! rowspan="2" style="text-align:center;"|Party leader
!rowspan="2"|Candidates
! colspan="3" style="text-align:center;"|MHAs
!colspan="3" style="text-align:center;"|Popular vote
|- style="background:#cccc;"
| style="text-align:center;"|1966
| style="text-align:center;"|1971
| style="text-align:center;"|±
| style="text-align:center;"|#
| style="text-align:center;"|%
| style="text-align:center;"|± (pp)

|align=left|Frank Moores
|align="right"|42
|align="right"|3
|align="right"|21
|align="right"|18
|align="right"|120,655
|align="right"|51.34%
|align="right"|17.65

|align=left|Joey Smallwood
|align="right"|42
|align="right"|39
|align="right"|20
|align="right"|19
|align="right"|104,523
|align="right"|44.48%
|align="right"|16.85

|align=left|Tom Burgess
|align="right"|3
|align="right"|n/a
|align="right"|1
|align="right"|1
|align="right"|5,595
|align="right"|2.38%
|align="right"|n/a

|align=left|John Connors
|align="right"|17
|align="right"|0
|align="right"|0
|align="right"|
|align="right"|3,718
|align="right"|1.58%
|align="right"|0.24

|colspan="2" align=left|Independent Liberal
|align="right"|3
|align="right"|0
|align="right"|0
|align="right"|
|align="right"|407
|align="right"|0.17%
|align="right"|n/a

|colspan="2" align="left"|Independent
|align="right"|1
|align="right"|0
|align="right"|0
|align="right"|
|align="right"|109
|align="right"|0.05%
|align="right"|2.33
|- style="background:#EAECF0;"
| style="text-align:left;" colspan="3"|Total
| style="text-align:right;"|108
| style="text-align:right;"|42
| style="text-align:right;"|42
| style="text-align:right;"|
| style="text-align:right;"|235,007
| style="text-align:right;"|100%
| style="text-align:right;"|
|}

Notes

References

 

Elections in Newfoundland and Labrador
Newfoundland
1971 in Newfoundland and Labrador
October 1971 events in Canada